Sutta Kadhai is a 2013 Indian Tamil-language black comedy film written and directed by Subu in his directorial debut. The film features an ensemble cast including Balaji Venugopal, Venkatesh Harinathan, Dongli Jumbo, Lakshmi Priyaa Chandramouli, Nassar, M. S. Bhaskar, Lakshmi Ramakrishnan, and Jayaprakash. The plot revolves around two police constables who try to solve a murder case in a village.

Ravinder Chandrashekar of Libra Productions produced the film, while cinematography was handled by Nizar. Sathish took charge of choreography, while Suriya was the editor. The music was composed by Harish Harz and Prashanth, better known by their stage name Madley Blues. Principal photography took place in and around Kodaikanal. The film released on 25 October 2013.

Cast
 Balaji Venugopal as Ramki
 Venkatesh Harinathan as Sangilimaaran
 Dongli Jumbo as Singamuthu
 Lakshmi Priyaa Chandramouli as Silandhi
 Nassar as Thirumeni
 M. S. Bhaskar as Ottagam
 Lakshmi Ramakrishnan
 Jayaprakash
 R. S. Shivaji
 Rinson Simon
 Jayamani

Production

Subu, who had earlier served as a lyricist for the movie Aarohanam, completed the first schedule in Kodaikanal in March 2013. Two of the actors, Venkatesh and Lakshmi Priyaa, have worked with Chennai-based theatre groups, Stray Factory and Evam respectively. Lakshmi Priyaa, who plays the role of a tribal girl in Sutta Kadhai, liked the script because the storyline of the dark comedy was different."

According to Subu, Sutta Kadhai will be a different creation because of the milieu of the story. "Even as the rip-roaring instances happen, the underlying factors are spine-chilling. It is all about a murder and the ensuing enquiry. The story takes place at night, and we shot the film extensively in Kodaikanal. One night while shooting, we were confronted by a herd of wild buffaloes, which added to the thrill," says Subu.

Soundtrack
The music was composed by Madley Blues, a band consisting of Harish Venkat and Prashanth Techno. The audio launch was held on 1 June at the Victoria Hall in Geneva, Switzerland along with the audios of Nalanum Nandhiniyum and Thillu Mullu, audio was relaunched in Chennai at Sathyam Cinemas by Nassar, director A. L. Vijay and Studio Green K. E. Gnanavel Raja, amidst the presence of  C. V. Kumar, actor Ramakrishnan, J. S. Nandhini, producer Ashok G. Loth, Amma Creations T. Siva, Karu Pazhaniappan, comedian Sathish, director SuBu, composer K, and film actors Balaji, Venkatesh, and Lakshmi Priyaa. Behindwoods wrote:"Makes right noises".

 "Anbe Aaruyire" — Harish Venkat
 "Ding Dong Kuthu Song" — Mano, Solar Sai
 "Kaattukulla Kannamoochi" — Vijay Prakash, Harish Venkat, Harshitha
 "Twist on top" — Harish Venkat, Venky, Subu
 "Unnai Naanum" — Harish Venkat
 "Yele Yele" — M. S. Viswanathan, Harish Venkat

Release
The satellite rights of the film were sold to Puthuyugam, and the film had its television premiere on 3 November 2013 one week after its theatrical release.

Critical reception
The film received mixed reviews. Baradwaj Rangan wrote "Subu has a superb eye for the absurd. The film is filled with borderline-surreal non sequiturs, some of which are downright Monty Pythonesque. The problem is that the director feels compelled to connect these bits through a “story,” and the plot, even at an hour and 45 minutes, is a major drag". Behindwoods wrote: "Though director Subu's intelligence and wit can't be questioned, this murder mystery never takes itself seriously and resolves too conveniently in the end. The twists straighten themselves out, all too easily. If the movie had offered more laugh-worthy moments, particularly in the second half, the end product could have been memorable". Indiaglitz wrote: "Sutta Kadhai' is a bright idea, which could have followed a more gripping screenplay to keep the audience involved, than just complete the procedure of getting the film done. The minor details to keep this movie stand out, have been taken utmost care to be accomplished with".

References

External links
 

2013 films
2010s Tamil-language films
Indian black comedy films
2013 directorial debut films
2013 black comedy films